The Mazda CX-8 is a mid-size crossover SUV produced by Mazda since the end of 2017. It is a three-row version of the CX-5. The CX-8 is Mazda's flagship SUV in Japan, as the larger, export-only CX-9 is not sold in the country. Outside of Japan, the CX-8 is available in China, Oceania, and Southeast Asia.

Overview
First unveiled on 14 September 2017 in Japan, the CX-8 is the only three-row SUV offered in the country, and became the only three-row vehicle offered by the company following the discontinuation of Mazda minivans such as the Biante and Premacy.

While bearing resemblance to the second generation CX-9, and sharing the same outer tail lights, the CX-8 is 17 cm shorter in length and 13 cm narrower in width to conform to Japanese conditions. Within a few weeks after its introduction in Japan, Mazda dealers received over 12,000 orders from consumers in Japan.

Initially announced as a Japan-exclusive model, Mazda introduced the vehicle in Australia in July 2018 and positioning it below the slightly larger CX-9. Unlike the CX-9, the CX-8 is available with a diesel engine option. It is also assembled and marketed in Malaysia since late 2019, also for exports to several Southeast Asian countries.

Offered with three-row seating, it is available in a seven seater configuration with second row bench seat, and a six seater configuration where the second row consists of captain seats with a center console as an armrest, storage and includes cup holders. With the third row seats in place, the CX-8 offers 209 litres of luggage space.

The CX-8 was initially offered only with a 2.2 L Skyactiv-D diesel engine, but a choice of two I4 petrol engines was added in 2018: a 2.5 L Skyactiv-G (PY-VPS) from the CX-5 and a turbocharged version of the same engine from the CX-9.

Reception
Marton Pettendy of Australian publication Motoring gave the CX-8 a rating of 84 out of 100, praising the quality and refinement, performance and economy, and diesel power for less than the CX-9, but criticizing the tight rear head/leg room, sub par warranty and service intervals, and the lack of a spare tire and CarPlay. 

Malcolm Flynn of Australian publication CarsGuide rated the car 8.1. out of 10, praising its ease of parking compared to the CX-9, more useful boot space than the CX-5, and its comfortable ride, but criticising its lack of a petrol engine and CarPlay, and the steep price jump between the Sport and Asaki trims. 

Paul Maric of Australian publication CarAdvice gave the car a rating of 7.9 out of 10, calling it a "compelling proposition for families that need the extra space of an occasional third row and the fuel economy of a diesel engine."

Markets

New Zealand 
In New Zealand, the CX-8 is only available with a diesel engine. On launch, two trim options were available GSX FWD and Limited AWD. From the model year of 2019, the trim GSX AWD has been sold with a number of technical upgrades and the Limited AWD trim has been discontinued and replaced with the trim Takami (sold as Asaki in Australia).

Thailand 
In Thailand, the CX-8 is available with a petrol and diesel engine. On launch, four trims options were available 2.5 High (S), 2.5 High Plus (SP), 2.2 XDL FWD (seven seats) and 2.2 XDL Exclusive AWD (six seats: lounge). Then in 19 October 2021 the New trim 2.5 High Plus (SP) Exclusive FWD (six seats: lounge) is released.

Malaysia 
In Malaysia, the CX-8 is available with a petrol and diesel engine options. Four trims were available 2.5G 2WD Mid (seven seats), 2.5G 2WD Mid Plus (six seats), 2.5G 2WD High (six seats: lounge) and 2.2D AWD High (six seats: lounge). In late June 2022, the trims for the updated CX-8 have been revised, now consist of 2.5 Mid 2WD (seven seats), 2.5 High 2WD (six seats), 2.5 High Plus 2WD (six seats) and a new 2.5T High Plus AWD (six seats). The AWD system on 2.2D High Plus trim had dropped and now only available as 2WD.

Philippines 
The CX-8 was launched alongside the Mazda CX-30 on 28 November 2019. Only one 2.5-litre petrol engine is available with two trims, offered the Signature and Exclusive. The former has a seven-seat configuration, and is available only in front-wheel drive, while the latter comes with a seven-seat configuration and is only available with all-wheel drive.

Sales

References

External links 

 
 (Australia)

CX-8
Cars introduced in 2017
2020s cars
Mid-size sport utility vehicles
Crossover sport utility vehicles
Front-wheel-drive vehicles
All-wheel-drive vehicles